The Northern Counties Committee (NCC) Class W was a class of locomotives introduced in 1933 and allocated to express passenger duties from , Belfast.

Design and build
The design was attributed to the NCC's Chief Mechanical Engineer H. P. Stewart who was with the permission of William Stanier able to draw on designs and parts from the NCC's owners, the London Midland and Scottish Railway (LMS). The resultant design is understood to have been an Irish 5ft 3in gauge tender version of the LMS Fowler 2-6-4T tank engine with  diameter wheels which were three inches wider than its predecessor.

Operations and performance
On introduction the Class W moguls took over the principal main line expresses of the NCC.

The class was the motive power for the North Atlantic Express introduced in 1934 with the opening of the Greenisland Loop Line and the fastest services to  taking a mere 80 minutes.

The final six remaining locomotives of the class were withdrawn in 1965.

Livery and naming
When new the locomotives were painted in LMS crimson lake red livery until the NCC was absorbed into Ulster Transport Authority (UTA) in the later forties whereafter repaints were black with red and yellow lining.  The original plans were to name the class after Irish Chieftains, however there were concerns this might not be acceptable to some sections of the community.  In the event the naming split between British Nobility and geographical locations, the class lead was named Duke of Abercorn after the governor of Northern Ireland.

New build option
While none of the original class have survived, the Railway Preservation Society of Ireland possesses a spare set of driving wheels and motion and are being used to re-construct the next locomotive of the class, to be numbered 105. It will also use a spare tender that the group have numbered 43.

See also
Steam locomotives of the 21st century

References

W
2-6-0 locomotives
Steam locomotives of Northern Ireland
Steam locomotives of Ireland
Railway locomotives introduced in 1933
Scrapped locomotives
5 ft 3 in gauge locomotives